Boston Common, 8/17/71 is a live album by the rock group the Allman Brothers Band.  As the name suggests, it was recorded at Boston Common in Boston, Massachusetts, on August 17, 1971.  It is the fifth archival release by the Allman Brothers Band Recording Company, and the third one to feature the original lineup of the band.  It was released in 2007, and re-released in 2014.

Critical reception

Allmusic said, "The group's outdoor appearance in Boston occurred six weeks after the release of their breakthrough album, At Fillmore East, and ten weeks before [Duane] Allman's death. The song selection doesn't just repeat the tunes from the Fillmore East disc, the band opting instead for a few songs not heard on it... This is an album for the faithful, and it will not disappoint them."

All About Jazz said, "... it will remind both the aficionado and the dilettante that the scintillating peaks scaled by the Brothers' At Fillmore East were nevertheless revisited fairly regularly. The group brings an edgy energy – and, during the lengthiest improvisations, an altogether melancholy majesty – to a fairly standard set."

Track listing
Tuning – 2:01
"Statesboro Blues" (Blind Willie McTell) – 4:43
"Trouble No More" (Muddy Waters) – 4:53
"Don't Keep Me Wonderin'" (Gregg Allman) – 4:14
"You Don't Love Me" (Willie Cobbs) – 26:08
"Hoochie Coochie Man" (Willie Dixon) – 5:36
"In Memory of Elizabeth Reed" (Dickey Betts) – 13:02
"Whipping Post" (Gregg Allman) – 18:48

Personnel
The Allman Brothers Band
Duane Allman – guitar
Gregg Allman – keyboards, vocals
Dickey Betts – guitar
Berry Oakley – bass, vocals on "Hoochie Coochie Man"
Jaimoe – drums, percussion
Butch Trucks – drums, timpani
Production
Recording produced by the Allman Brothers Band
Package produced by Kirk West, Bert Holman
Mixing: Mike Callahan
Mastering: Capt. Skipper Littlewood
Package design: Lindsey Rogers

References

2007 live albums
The Allman Brothers Band live albums
Boston Common